Final tables for the 2004 season of the Kyrgyzstan League Second Level.

There was no final stage this year, because only Shumkar-M Kara-Su displayed intent to play in the Kyrgyzstan League the following year.
Luch Frunze withdrew to be replaced by FK Alamudun and KGUSTA changed their name to Dinamo-Chuy UVD.

First stage

Zone A  (Chuy Valley)

Zone B-1 (Batken Region)

Zone B-2 (Osh Region)

Kyrgyzstan League Second Level seasons
2
Kyrgyzstan
Kyrgyzstan